Coccothrinax hioramii is a palm which is endemic to eastern Cuba, in open sandy coastal areas.  Like other members of the genus, C. hioramii is a fan palm.  Trees are single-stemmed, between 6 and 12 metres tall with stems 7 to 15 centimetres in diameter. The fruit is black, 0.9–1.1 cm in diameter.

Henderson and colleagues spelled the name C. hiorami.

References

hioramii
Trees of Cuba
Plants described in 1939